Natalia Gambaro (born September 1, 1977) is an Argentine lawyer and politician who served as executive director of the Argentine National Agency for Controlled Materials from May 17, 2016 to July 4, 2018.

Background 
She was an advisor to the National Deputy Francisco de Narváez in the Foreign Relations and Constitutional Affairs committees between 2005 and 2007. In December 2009, she became a National Deputy for the province of Buenos Aires.

She was appointed as the executive director of the Argentine National Agency for Controlled Materials from May 17, 2016 to July 4, 2018.

References 

1997 births
Living people
21st-century Argentine women politicians
21st-century Argentine politicians
Argentine women lawyers
21st-century Argentine lawyers
Members of the Argentine Chamber of Deputies elected in Buenos Aires Province